Taoyuan is a special municipality of the Republic of China (Taiwan) located in northwestern Taiwan, neighboring New Taipei City to the north-east, Yilan County to the south-east, and Hsinchu County to the south-west. Taoyuan District is the seat of the municipal government and which, along with Zhongli District, forms a large metropolitan area. Taoyuan developed from a satellite city of Taipei metropolitan area to become the fourth-largest metropolitan area, and fifth-largest populated city in Taiwan. "Taoyuan" literally means "peach garden" in Chinese, since the area used to have many peach trees. Formerly a county, Taoyuan became the latest new founding special municipality in 2014.

Taoyuan City is home to many industrial parks and tech company headquarters. Due to the city's proximity to Taipei, and the lower cost of living, Taoyuan has had the fastest population growth of any city in Taiwan in recent decades. The city is also home to 116,000 foreign workers, with many coming from Southeast Asia and working in factories or as household caregivers. Taoyuan International Airport, which serves the capital, Taipei and the rest of northern Taiwan, is located in this city.

History

Early history
In ancient times, the Taoyuan plateau was the home of the Taiwanese plains aborigines. In the early years of Dutch colonization, Spanish colonization, and Zheng He of the Ming Dynasty, there were no large-scale cultivation or industrial activities. During the Qing era, a number of people from Fujian Province and Guangdong province began to immigrate into present-day Taoyuan to develop and farm the land. They planted peach trees, which, when fully bloomed in spring, were so beautiful that the people named the land Toahong.

Empire of Japan

In November 1901, during Japanese era, a local administrative office, was established in the area, and renamed  in 1905. In 1920, the Tōen area was incorporated into Shinchiku Prefecture.

During the Japanese era, the staged migration policy caused Taoyuan to develop into a city with a variety of cultures. For example, temples and worship paths (currently the Taoyuan Martyrs Shrine) symbolized cultural systems.  were used to represent military systems, and the old Taoyuan City Office signified political systems.

Republic of China
After the transfer from Japan to the Republic of China, the present day-area of Taoyuan City was incorporated under Hsinchu County. In 1950, Taoyuan County was established by separating it from Hsinchu County. On 21 April 1971, Taoyuan City was made the county seat of Taoyuan County. It had 6 cities, 1 urban township and 6 rural townships.

In June 2009, the Executive Yuan approved the plan to upgrade Taoyuan from a county to a special municipality. On 25 December 2014, Taoyuan County was upgraded into a special municipality of Taoyuan City.

Geography
It is made up of low-lying plains, interconnected mountains and plateaus. Its shape has a long and narrow southeast-to-northwest trend, with the southeast in the Xueshan Range and the far end on the shores of the Taiwan Strait.

There are many irrigation ponds at Taoyuan Plateau, which caused Taoyuan to earn the nickname "Thousand-pond Township".

Climate
Taoyuan has a humid subtropical climate, with mild to warm winters and hot summers, typical of northern Taiwan.

(The climate data of Taipei City is shown below for reference due to the city's proximity to Taipei.)

Ethnic composition

Han Chinese

Hoklo
As of most of the cities and urban towns of Taiwan, Minnan people (Hoklos) are one of the largest ethnic groups of Taoyuan, most of whom live in northern Taoyuan (北桃園) which comprises the northern districts of Taoyuan, including Taoyuan city centre, Bade, Daxi, Dayuan, Guishan and Luzhu, and the city seat of government, Taoyuan District citycentre.

Hakka
The Hakka are the second-largest ethnic group in the city after the Minnan ethnicity (Hoklo) who won against the Hakkas in clan wars moved to the poor mountainous regions in southern Taoyuan, most of the Hakka peasants live in the rural peasant village areas of southern Taoyuan (南桃園), which includes Zhongli, Pingzhen, Yangmei, Longtan, Guanyin and Xinwu districts. With more than 785,000 Hakka people, Taoyuan hosts the largest Hakka population among all of Taiwan's administrative divisions.

Waishengren
After the Chinese Civil War, many people from mainland China (unaffectionately referred to as "Waishengren") settled in the then-Taoyuan County after the retreat of the nationalist government in 1949. Most of them live in military dependents' villages in Zhongli, Pingzhen and Guishan. Longgang is well known for its immigrants from Yunnan, featuring many Yunnan-style restaurants.

Aborigines
Most Taiwanese aborigines in the city live in Fuxing District, with most of them belonging to the Atayal people.

Economy
Taoyuan is one of the Taiwan's top industrial and technological cities. High-tech companies including Quanta, MiTAC, Inotera, Nanya Technology, HTC, CPT and AU Optronics have all opted to build or expand their factories in Taoyuan. Taoyuan has now become a bastion of electronics and semiconductor manufacturing. Over 200 of Taiwan's top 500 manufacturing companies have factories in Taoyuan. Taoyuan has also led Taiwan in terms of industrial output for nine straight years.

There are also 9 sites (57 ha; 140 acres) for mixed industrial-commercial use, the most of any county and city in Taiwan.

On 26 March 2010, China Airlines (Taiwan's government-owned airline) moved into its new headquarters on the grounds of Taipei Taoyuan International Airport and in Dayuan Township in Taoyuan County (now Dayuan District, Taoyuan). EVA Air maintains its headquarters in Luzhu District. Evergreen Airlines Services Corporation, Evergreen Aviation Technologies Corp., and Evergreen Air Cargo Services Corporation, subsidiaries of Evergreen Group, are headquartered in Dayuan.

On 25 December 2016, The Asia Silicon Valley Development Agency (ASVDA) was inaugurated in northern Taoyuan City, in a governmental effort to foster innovation, promote the Internet of Things (IoT) sector and attract top-class technology talent. The Asian Silicon Valley project aimed to transform Taiwan into an R&D hub for the IoT sector as well as a global center of entrepreneurship.

Industry and environment
A former RCA facility is located in the city. The RCA facility is the source of significant trichloroethylene contamination.

Administration

Taoyuan City is divided into 12 municipal districts and 1 mountain indigenous district. The city government is located within Taoyuan District.

Colors indicate the common language status of Hakka and Formosan languages within each division.

Prior to its upgrade to become municipality on 25 December 2014, Taoyuan County used to have 6 county-administered cities (Bade, Luzhu, Pingzhen, Taoyuan, Yangmei, Zhongli), 1 urban township (Daxi), 5 rural townships (Dayuan, Guanyin, Guishan, Longtan, Xinwu), and 1 Mountain indigenous township (Fuxing).

Tourism

Historical sites 
Daxi Old Street
Daxi Old Street is one of the more famous Taiwanese old streets. It used to be a bustling hub for camphor and the tea trade, filled with diverse stores with façades designed in a Baroque style. The street also has the Daxi Wood Art Ecomuseum, which includes buildings such as Daxi Butokuden and Lee Teng-fan's Ancient Residence.

Furen Temple
Furen Temple was established in 1813, dedicated to Kai Zhang Sheng Wang and the temple is located along Daxi Old Street in Daxi District.

Tianhou Temple
Tianhou Temple was established in 1826, and is located in Xinwu District. The temple built a magnificent bronze statue of Goddess Mazu in 2002, which is the 2nd-tallest statue of Mazu in Taiwan and the 3rd-tallest in the world.

Taoyuan Martyrs' Shrine
Taoyuan Martyrs' Shrine is one of the best-kept Shinto shrines outside Japan.

Nature attractions
Shimen Reservoir
Shihmen Reservoir is one of Taiwan's major reservoirs. Once the largest water conservancy project in Southeast Asia, visitors may find many restaurants open near the reservoir serving fresh reservoir fish delicacies. There is also a  bikeway surrounding the back pond. Shimen Reservoir provides almost all of the water in Taoyuan, as well as to New Taipei City's Xinzhuang, Banqiao, and Linkou districts.

Lala Mountain
Lala Mountain is one of Taiwan's "natural protection zones," including 500- to 2,800-year-old divine trees and the "No. 5 Divine Tree," which predates Confucius.

Museums and art centers 
Taoyuan Arts Center
Taoyuan Arts Center is the main performance center in Taoyuan, located in Taoyuan Zhongzheng Arts and Cultural Business District.

Hengshan Calligraphy Art Center
Hengshan Calligraphy Art Center is the first official art museum in Taiwan with the theme of calligraphy.

Others 
Cihu Mausoleum
Cihu Mausoleum is the final resting place of the former president of the Republic of China, Chiang Kai-shek.

Window on China Theme Park
The Window on China Theme Park is one of Taiwan's earliest theme parks, established in 1984. The park consists of three areas: Mini World, Water Park, and Amusement Park. The park features numerous small-scale replicas of many famous world landmarks.

Longgang Mosque
The Longgang Mosque in Zhongli District is Taiwan's fifth mosque. It was originally built in 1967 to serve an area with many Taiwanese Muslims.

Taoyuan Aquarium X PARK
X PARK is a public aquarium operated by Yokohama Hakkeijima. The Taiwanese sea-themed tank "Formosa" is popular.

Government and politics

The Taoyuan City Government is the municipal government of Taoyuan. The Taoyuan City Council is the elected municipal council of Taoyuan, the council composes of 60 councillors elected once every four years by single non-transferable vote.

Mayor

In 2001, Eric Chu of the Kuomintang defeated Democratic Progressive Party incumbent Peng Shao-Chin in the race for Taoyuan County magistrate. Peng had inherited the magistrate position after Annette Lu vacated the post to serve as vice president. Chu ran for re-election in 2005 and defeated DPP challenger Pao-Ching Cheng, CEO of the Taiwan Salt Company.

In 2009, John Wu of the KMT defeated his DPP opponent, Cheng Wen-tsan and became the Magistrate of Taoyuan County.

In 2014, following the upgrade of Taoyuan County to Taoyuan City, Cheng Wen-tsan of the DPP won the Taoyuan City mayoral election and became the city's first mayor.

In 2022 Taoyuan City mayoral election, Chang San-cheng of the KMT was elected as the new mayor.

Education

Public universities
Central Police University
National Central University
National Defense University
National Taiwan Sport University

Private universities
Chang Gung University
Chung Yuan Christian University
Kainan University
Yuan Ze University

Technical and vocational universities
Chien Hsin University of Science and Technology
Lunghwa University of Science and Technology
Vanung University

Military Academies
Army Academy R.O.C.
Republic of China Army Communication, Electronics and Information School
Republic of China Army Chemical School
Republic of China Army Logistics School
Republic of China Military Police School

Public high schools
The Affiliated Jhongli Senior High School of National Central University
Taoyuan Municipal Nei Li Senior High School
Taoyuan Municipal Taoyuan Senior High School
Taoyuan Municipal Yang Mei Senior High School
Taoyuan Municipal Yang Ming Senior High School
 Taoyuan Municipal Wu-Ling Senior High School
Taoyuan Municipal Dasi Senior High School
Taoyuan Municipal Dayuan International Senior High School
Taoyuan Municipal Nankan Senior High School
Taoyuan Municipal Pingjen Senior High School
Taoyuan Municipal Shoushan Senior High School
 Taoyuan Municipal Yung-Feng High School
Taoyuan Municipal Yungfong Senior High School
Taoyuan Municipal Xinwu High School
Taoyuan Municipal Longtan Senior High School
Taoyuan Municipal LuoFu Senior High School
Taoyuan Municipal Guanyin High School

Junior high schools

Elementary schools

Taoyuan Main Public Library 

Taoyuan Main Public Library is the central library of Taoyuan, located in Taoyuan Zhongzheng Arts and Cultural Business District. The new library building opened on December, 2022. It is the largest local public library in Taiwan.

Sports

The Taoyuan International Baseball Stadium is home to the Rakuten Monkeys of the Chinese Professional Baseball League (CPBL). Taoyuan also has two professional basketball teams, the Taoyuan Leopards of the T1 League and the Taoyuan Pauian Pilots of the P. League+ (shared with Changhua County).

The Taoyuan County Stadium, built in 1993, is a multi-use stadium used mostly for football matches that also has an athletics track. The stadium has a capacity of 30,000 spectators. It is within walking distance southwest from Taoyuan Senior High School Station of the Taiwan Railway Administration.

The Taoyuan Arena, also built in 1993, is an indoor sporting arena located in Taoyuan District. The concept of its roof structure was based on the bicycle structure, the outer ring (to bear pressure) and inner tire (to bear tensile strength) of the bicycle wheels are connected by cable wires. It is used to host indoor sporting events, such as basketball and volleyball.

The then-Taoyuan County is also the birthplace of Taiwanese professional golfer Yani Tseng and taekwondo athlete Chu Mu-Yen.

Recent major sporting events held by Taoyuan include:
 2004 Asian Karate Championships
 2011 BWF World Junior Championships
 2015 Asia Pacific Deaf Games
 2015 WBSC Premier12 (co-hosted with Taichung, Taipei, and Yunlin (Douliu))
 2018 World Taekwondo Grand Prix (Series 3)
 2019 WBSC Premier12 (co-hosted with Taichung)
 2019 Asian Airgun Championships

Notable persons 
 Yani Tseng (Guishan District)
 Jerry Yan
 Cheng Wen-tsan (Bade District)
 Eric Chu (Bade District)

Transportation

Rail

Taiwan Railways Administration Western Line（Taoyuan - Zhonglu - Taoyuan Hospital - Neili - Chungyuan - Zhongli - Pingzhen - Puxin - Yangmei - Fugang - Xinfu）

Taiwan High Speed Rail
Taoyuan Station is located at the Qingpu (青埔) area, in Zhongli District.

Mass Rapid Transit
The rapid transit system of the city is Taoyuan Metro and is operational since April 2017.
Lines and stations of the Taoyuan MRT System:

Road
National Highway No. 1 and 3 are nearby and connect via local highways to the city itself. National Highway No. 2 connects to Taoyuan International Airport. Bridges in the city are Luofu Bridge.

Bus
 Taoyuan Bus Co. 
 Zhongli Bus Co.

Air

Taipei Taoyuan International Airport at Dayuan District is the largest airport in Taiwan.  It serves as the main international hub for China Airlines and EVA Air. Taipei Taoyuan handled a total of 25,114,418 passengers in 2010. It is the fifteenth-busiest air freight hub in the world and thirteenth-busiest airport by international passenger traffic. Taipei Taoyuan International Airport currently has two terminals which are connected by two, short people movers. A third terminal and a rapid transit system linking the terminals together underground are currently under construction.

International relations

Twin towns – Sister cities

 Aur Atoll, Marshall Islands (2018)
 Hartford County, Connecticut, United States (1982)
 Alameda County, California, United States (1977)
 Miaoli City, Taiwan (2006)
 Dallas County, Texas, United States (2007)
 Incheon, South Korea (2009)
 Ramat Gan, Israel (2016)
 Kota Kinabalu, Malaysia (2017)
 Grenoble, France (2018)
 Miyazaki, Miyazaki, Japan (2018)
 Narita, Chiba, Japan (2016)

See also

Taoyuan–Zhongli metropolitan area
Taoyuan International Airport

Notes

Words in native languages

References

External links 
 
 
  
 

Articles containing video clips
Municipalities of Taiwan